Kévin Ajax (born 31 August 1987) is a Guadeloupean professional footballer who plays as a goalkeeper for the club Moulien, and the Guadeloupe national team.

International career
Ajax debuted with the Guadeloupe national team in a 4–1 friendly loss to Martinique on 26 June 2017. He was called up to represent Guadeloupe at the 2021 CONCACAF Gold Cup.

References

External links
 
 

1987 births
Living people
People from Basse-Terre
Guadeloupean footballers
Guadeloupe international footballers
CS Moulien players
Association football goalkeepers
2021 CONCACAF Gold Cup players